Richard James Evans (11 October 1914 – 29 May 1943) was a South African cricketer who played first-class cricket for Border from 1934 to 1940.

Richard Evans was a leg-spin and googly bowler who had an exceptional career strike-rate: a wicket every 31.48 deliveries. He had an outstanding season for Border in 1937–38 when he was 23. In the first match, against Western Province, he took 5 for 72 and 4 for 92, and Border won by seven wickets. Then, in Border's innings victory over Eastern Province he took 4 for 50 and 6 for 40. Later, in the victory over Orange Free State, he took 5 for 27 and 2 for 28, and a week after that, in the loss to Transvaal, he took 2 for 29 and 8 for 64. He finished the season with 36 wickets in five matches off 867 balls at a bowling average of 13.11 and a strike-rate of a wicket every 24.08 balls. Only Norman Gordon of Transvaal, with 39 wickets off 1798 balls, took more wickets in the season.

However, Evans's considerable promise was unfulfilled. He played only two more first-class matches before the Second World War, in which he died at sea off Cape Town, aged 28. He died while serving in the South African Air Force when his Avro Anson stalled and crashed into the sea off Danger Point.

References

External links

1914 births
1943 deaths
South African cricketers
Border cricketers
Cricketers from East London, Eastern Cape
People who died at sea
South African Air Force personnel of World War II
South African Air Force officers
South African military personnel killed in World War II
Aviators killed in aviation accidents or incidents
Victims of aviation accidents or incidents in 1943
Victims of aviation accidents or incidents in South Africa